Neskuchny Garden (literally meaning "not boring" or "merry") is the oldest park in Moscow, Russia.

TV broadcasting of famous game What? Where? When? takes place in the Okhotnichy domik that is located in the Neskuchny Garden.

External links
 Neskuchny Garden
 Green dress of Moscow
Photo gallery

Parks and gardens in Moscow
Cultural heritage monuments of regional significance in Moscow